The Associação Desportiva Cabense is a Brazilian football club located in Cabo de Santo Agostinho, Pernambuco. Cabense currently play in the Campeonato Pernambucano Série A2.

Stadium
Cabense plays their home matches at the Estádio Gileno de Carli which has a capacity of 5,000 seats.

Current squad
According to the CBF register.

Performance Competitions

Campeonato Pernambucano - First Division

Campeonato Pernambucano - Second Division

Pernambuco Cup

References

Football clubs in Pernambuco
Association football clubs established in 1995
1995 establishments in Brazil